John Brown Jr. (July 25, 1821 – May 3, 1895) was the eldest son of the abolitionist John Brown. His mother was Brown's first wife, Dianthe Lusk Brown, who died when John Jr. was 11. He was born in Hudson, Ohio. In 1841 he tried teaching in a country school, but left it after one year, finding it frustrating and the children "snotty". In spring 1842 he enrolled at the Grand River Institute in Austinburg, Ohio. In July 1847 he married Wealthy Hotchkiss (1829–1911). The couple settled in Springfield, Massachusetts.

He was described by a Kansas acquaintance as "a man of education, and of more than common abilities. Strictly honest and conscientious." "His family and himself are beloved and sympathized with by his neighbors of all parties; and well he may be; for he is one of the finest specimens of men, physically and intellectually. ...He is a man who would be distinguished anywhere for his active, energetic temperament and fearless manner. Socially he is amiable, warm hearted and affectionate."

Kansas
John Jr. moved with four of his brothers to Kansas Territory in spring 1855. While his brothers Frederick, Owen, and Salmon traveled by land, John Jr., his brother Jason, and their families traveled by boat, across the state of Missouri on the Missouri River.  John Jr. described the trip as "a horrid business in a low stage of water which is a considerable portion of the year." Most of the passengers and crew were pro-slavery, and the captain deliberately left the two boys' parties behind at a stop in Waverly, Missouri.

He was elected to the territorial legislature—the Topeka Legislature—in 1856.

John Jr. did not join his father and brothers in the Pottawatomie Massacre of May, 1856. However, he was captured by Henry Clay Pate, a border ruffian and commander of a proslavery militia, in connection with the murders. He was turned over to federal authority, Captain Thomas J. Wood. He was beaten by the soldiers and suffered a mental breakdown. His father, John Brown, plotted a rescue. His troops overtook proslavery men in the Battle of Black Jack near Palmyra on June 2, 1856. The elder Brown captured Pate and his men, provisions, horses, mules, and equipment. He agreed to release the prisoners in exchange for his sons.

A pro-slavery court in Lecompton charged John Jr. with high treason because he was a free-state politician. He was finally released from prison in September. Shortly after this, John Jr. left Kansas with his father. His father took his son's heavy chains and padlocks first to Concord to show to "Emerson and his friends", and then he held them up at antislavery meetings in different places.

The raid on Harpers Ferry
John Jr. did not participate in his father's raid on Harpers Ferry, Virginia (since 1863, West Virginia). Kansapedia says that when the time came to make a decision on participation, "Brown, who was suffering from mental illness, experienced more anxiety."
However, he knew all the details and was part of the process of preparing for the raid.

John Brown sent John Jr. on a journey throughout the state of Pennsylvania, wanting him to find men "of the right stripe", willing to join John Brown's raiders. The areas that John Jr. was ordered to visit, specifically, were Gettysburg, Bedford, Chambersburg, and Uniontown. John Jr. also spent time visiting Massachusetts, New York, and Canada, trying to enlist black supporters. Neither of these missions produced the desired results, and the "army" attacking the Arsenal was merely twenty-one men.

In the early summer of 1859 John travelled around what is today Ontario, Canada (Hamilton, St. Catharines, Chatham, London, Buxton, and Windsor), seeking support from Canadian negroes for his father's project. He found little support.

John Jr. acted as his father's liaison for the raid in Virginia. In 1858, John Brown sent John Jr. to Virginia. This mission was to survey the area surrounding Harper's Ferry.

Because of tensions between John Brown and other members of the plans and cause, John Brown appointed John Jr. as the intelligence agent and liaison. This meant that John Jr. would be the go-between for John Brown and other members. This provided safety for John Brown and secrecy.

John Jr. received word from his father to move the "tools" for the raid. The letter told John Jr. to do this "with perfect quiet" and to move only the tools, "not the other stuff", to a safe place where only Jr. and "the keeper" would know where they were. This cryptic message was received and Jr. travelled to Conneaut, Ohio, where the weapons had been secretly shipped, and moved them several miles south to a farm in Cherry Valley Township, Ohio.

When his brother Owen escaped capture, he took safe refuge with John Jr. at this home in northeast Ohio.

In early 1860, the U.S. Senate created a Select Committee to report on the invasion of Harper's Ferry. James M. Mason, head of the committee, submitted a resolution to compel John Jr. and two others to testify. A deputy of the Senate's Sergeant-at-Arms was sent to arrest the individuals—according to the report, Brown was then living in Ashtabula County, Ohio—and bring them to Washington. The deputy reported that Brown could not be arrested without the employment of armed force. In the summer  "an armed party of twelve persons" attempted unsuccessfully to carry him off.

Civil War and Jennison's Jayhawkers
In the summer of 1860, John Jr. was an agent of the "Haytian Bureau of Emigration", working under his father's former associate and biographer James Redpath. Brown served as the agent of emigration for the British North American Provinces between 1860 and 1861.

In July 1861, Brown decided to recruit a company of soldiers that would travel to Kansas and enlist with Kansas volunteer forces then operating in Missouri under the auspices of Kansas Senator James H. Lane. His intention was to enlist "abolitionists of the intense sort" and muster them under Colonel James Montgomery, one of Lane's three Lieutenants. In August he wrote to Gerrit Smith from Jefferson, Ashtabula County, Ohio, returning to him the land he had been given in North Elba. John Brown's "Sharpshooters" garnered significant press attention as they traveled from Ohio to Kansas. However, on its arrival, the company had only signed 66 men. On November 9, 1861, while Brown was still recruiting in Michigan, the company elected to join Colonel Charles R. Jennison's First Kansas Cavalry, later designated the Kansas Seventh Volunteer Cavalry, and known in Missouri as Jennison's Jayhawkers. Upon his own arrival in December, Brown was mustered in as the captain of Company K of the Kansas Seventh. Brown served as captain of the company until May 1862, when he resigned because of his rheumatoid arthritis. He was succeeded as captain of the company by his second lieutenant, George H. Hoyt, who had been one of his father's lawyers following the Harpers Ferry attack.

Post-war

Following his resignation, in 1862 Brown purchased  on the south shore of South Bass Island at Put-in-Bay, Ohio, at that time sparsely populated. He and his brother Owen appear on an 1863 list of people in Put-in-Bay subject to Civil War Draft Registration. He remained there until his death, supporting himself by raising fruit. An obituary said that on a plot of  he raised "grapes for the Detroit market", and "no doubt it would have pleased his father that he never sold grapes for wine-making." A visitor about 1871 described him as a "quiet, genial, warm-hearted farmer, amateur geologist, and land surveyor"; a later one as "sunny, cheery-voiced", with "fine manners and an easy address".

His sister Ruth and her husband Henry Thompson also lived for nineteen years at Put-In-Bay.

He became a socialist later in life. He  "traveled for a time as a lecturer on phrenology".

In 1882 "Mr. Brown enjoys a standing and consideration among his neighbors that may be envied"; he was one of the community's leading citizens. That year he travelled to Martinsville, Indiana, to identify the body of his brother Watson. (See Burning of Winchester Medical College.) He was the guest of the Governor of Indiana for dinner.
 
In 1883 he penned a lengthy reply to an attack upon his father's actions in Kansas, especially at the Pottawatomie massacre. Kansas Senator John James Ingalls also published a reply.

In 1887 he was a justice of the peace. He remained at Put-In-Bay until his death on May 3, 1895, living a life described as "quiet, retired, but happy." In contrast with his brother Owen, he "delights to tell the tragic story of his father's life to intimate acquaintances". He received a Masonic funeral, and thousands attended; it was described as the largest funeral ever held in Put-in-Bay. He is buried in Crown Hill Cemetery there.

In popular culture

He is portrayed by Dennis Weaver in the 1955 American historical drama film Seven Angry Men.

In The Good Lord Bird, a 2020 Showtime Limited Series based on the 2013 novel of the same name, he is played by Nick Eversman.

Archival material
Papers of John Brown Jr. are held by the Rutherford B. Hayes Presidential Center, Fremont, Ohio, and the Ohio Historical Society, Columbus, Ohio. His 1861–63 correspondence with his wife Wealthy (162 pages) is at the Kansas Historical Society, Topeka, Kansas. Several pages in various letters are written in numerical code, which he left us a key to, and they have been transcribed. Those under 18 require a parent's permission to read these letters. A few other letters of John Jr. are also available there.

Published writing

Notes

Sources
 
 
 
 
 
 

Family of John Brown (abolitionist)
Union Army officers
1821 births
1895 deaths
American socialists
People from Hudson, Ohio
John Brown and family in Kansas
People from North Elba, New York
People from Put-In-Bay, Ohio
People from Kansas
People from Ashtabula County, Ohio